Vizianagaram is a city and the headquarters of the Vizianagaram district in the Indian state of Andhra Pradesh. The city has a population of 228,025 and was established as the capital of the Vizianagaram estate by Raja Vijayaram Raj from the Pusapati dynasty. The rulers had a notable role in the history of the region in the 18th century and were patrons of education and arts.

History 

Excavations at this town revealed copper coins belonging to the remains of 900 B.C. (Kalinga period).

Geography 
It has an average elevation of 74 metres (242 feet).

Climate 

Vizianagaram has a tropical savanna climate (Köppen climate classification Aw) characterised by high humidity nearly year-round, with oppressive summers and good seasonal rainfall. The summer season extends from March to May, followed by monsoon season, which continues to September. October and November constitute the post-monsoon or retreating monsoon season. The normal rainfall of the district for the year is 1,131.0 mm, as compared to the actual rainfall of 740.6 mm received during 2002–2003. The district gets the benefit of both the southwest and northeast monsoon. The season from December to February generally has fine weather.

Demographics 
As of the 2011 Census of India, the town had a population of 227,533. The total population constituted 111,596 males and 115,937 females—a sex ratio of 1,039 females per 1,000 males, higher than the national average of 940 per 1,000. 20,487 children are in the age group of 0–6 years, of which 10,495 are boys and 9,992 are girls. The average literacy rate stood at 81.85% with 169,461 literates, significantly higher than the national average of 73.00%.

Telugu is the official language.

Governance

Civic administration 
The Vizianagaram Municipal Corporation is the civic body of the city, constituted as a municipality in 1888 before being upgraded to corporation on 9 December 2015. During 2010–11, the municipality spent  and generated .

Utility services 

Utility services include a water supply, sewer connections, drainage systems, parks, grounds, community centres, and healthcare. The municipality maintains 458 public taps, 749 bore–wells,  of roads,  of drains, 32 parks, 2 playgrounds, 49 elementary and 3 secondary schools and 1 maternity and child health centre.

Transport

Roadways 
The city has a total road length of 317.80 km. The Andhra Pradesh State Road Transport Corporation operates bus services from Vizianagaram bus station.

Educational 
The primary and secondary school education is imparted by government, aided and private schools of the School Education Department of the state.

Vizianagaram has educational institutions, including:
 Maharajah's College
 Maharajah's Government College of Music and Dance
 MVGR College of Engineering
 Andhra University – Vizianagaram Campus

See also 
 List of cities in Andhra Pradesh by population
 List of municipalities in Andhra Pradesh

References

External links 

 Vizianagaram official website

 
Cities in Andhra Pradesh
District headquarters of Andhra Pradesh
Mandal headquarters in Vizianagaram district
Quasi-princely estates of India
Towns in Vizianagaram district
Zamindari estates